The Atlantic LNG Company of Trinidad and Tobago is a liquefied natural gas (LNG) producing company operating a liquefied natural gas plant in Point Fortin, Trinidad and Tobago. Atlantic LNG operates four liquefaction units (trains).  Train 4, with a 5.2 million tonnes per year production capacity, is among the world's largest LNG trains in operation.

History
The Atlantic LNG project was started by Cabot LNG (now Suez) in 1992. In 1993, Cabot LNG, National Gas Company of Trinidad and Tobago, Amoco and British Gas plc signed the Memorandum of Understanding, and launched a feasibility study of the project. The Atlantic LNG company was formed in July 1995. general Construction of the first train started in 1996, and the train was officially opened on 13 March 1999. The first cargo was loaded in April 1999. Train 2 started up on 12 August 2002, Train 3 on 28 April 2003, and Train 4 in December 2005.  A feasibility study for the fifth train—Train X—was scheduled to be concluded by December 2007.

Technical features
The total production capacity of Atlantic LNG's four trains is around 14.8 million tonnes per year. The capacity of the Train 1 is 3 million tonnes per year, and the capacity of each of Trains 2 and 3 is 3.3 million tonnes per year. Train 4, which cost $1.2 billion, has a production capacity of 5.2 million tonnes per year. The total storage capacity of Atlantic LNG's facility is 524,000 cubic meters.  The total investment of building four LNG trains was US$3.6 billion.

The Train 1 is supplied from the BP-operated fields in the east coast of Trinidad through the NGC-Trinidad-and-Tobago-owned  diameter pipeline.

Train 2 is supplied from BP land (50%) off the east coast of Trinidad and from BG-operated land (50%) off the north coast (NCMA) through  diameter pipeline. Train 3 receives 75% of its supply from BP land and 25% from a mix of NCMA gas (as with Train 2) and east coast gas (ECMA) held 50% by BG and 50% by ChevronTexaco.

In 2021, BP Trinidad and Tobago informed the government of Trinidad and Tobago that due to gas production decline, there was insufficient gas to supply Train 1. The government decided despite spending US$250 million dollars on renovating the train to suspend operations for at least two years.

Shareholders
Atlantic LNG is owned by the National Gas Company of Trinidad and Tobago (NGC Trinidad and Tobago), Shell, BP, and the Chinese Investment Corporation (CIC).

The stakes in Train 1 are:
 Shell (46%)
 BP (34%)
 National Gas Company of Trinidad and Tobago (10%)
 Chinese Investment Corporation (10%)

The stakes in Trains 2 and 3 are:
 Shell (57.5%)
 BP (42.5%)

The stakes in Train 4 are:
 Shell (51.1%)
 BP (37.8%)
 National Gas Company of Trinidad and Tobago (11.1%)

In August 2007, the Vedomosti newspaper reported, that BP has invited Russia's Gazprom to take a stake in Atlantic LNG.

References

External links
 Corporate website

Oil and gas companies of Trinidad and Tobago
Liquefied natural gas plants
BP subsidiaries
BP buildings and structures
Natural gas in Trinidad and Tobago
Energy infrastructure in Trinidad and Tobago